Arthur Marshall Black is a former Australian international lawn bowler.

Bowls career
Black represented Australia in the pairs event at the 1986 Commonwealth Games.

He won two medals at the inaugural 1985 Asia Pacific Bowls Championships at Tweed Heads, New South Wales, including the fours gold medal with Keith Poole, Don Sherman and Wally Bonagura.

References

Australian male bowls players
Living people
Bowls players at the 1986 Commonwealth Games
Year of birth missing (living people)